The 29th American Music Awards were held on January 9, 2002, at the Shrine Auditorium, in Los Angeles, California. The awards recognized the most popular artists and albums from the year 2001.

Performances

Winners and nominees

References
 http://www.rockonthenet.com/archive/2002/amas.htm

2002
2002 music awards